George Wolfgang Forell (September 19, 1919 – April 29, 2011) was the Carver Distinguished Chair of Religion in the Department of Religious Studies at the University of Iowa. He was a scholar, author, lecturer, and guest professor in the field of Christian ethics.

Early life and education
Forell was born on September 19, 1919, in Breslau, Germany (now Wrocław, Poland). His father was Frederik J. Forell, co-founder of The Christian Social Services. He studied philosophy and theology at the University of Vienna. In 1939 he came to the United States as a refugee from Nazi Germany.  He enrolled at the Lutheran Theological Seminary at Philadelphia as a student in theology. He graduated in 1941 and was ordained as a Lutheran minister the same year. While serving as a parish pastor, he continued his education at Princeton Theological Seminary and Union Theological Seminary. In 1949 he received a Th.D. from Union Theological Seminary.

Academic career
Forell joined Gustavus Adolphus College in St. Peter, Minnesota, as a Professor of Philosophy in 1949. In 1954, he moved to the University of Iowa as Professor of Religion. In 1958–59 he served as guest-professor at the University of Hamburg, Germany.  He was Director of the Department of Religious Studies at The University of Iowa from 1966 to 1971.  In 1973, he was named Carver Distinguished Professor of Religion. Forell is a past president of the American Society for Reformation Research.  Forell has also served as a Professor of Systematic Theology at the Chicago Lutheran Theological Seminary in Maywood, Illinois (now part of the Lutheran School of Theology at Chicago) After his retirement from the University of Iowa in 1989, he lectured for extended periods of time in seminaries in Tokyo, Taiwan, Hong Kong, and other academic institutions in Asia and Europe.

Family and personal life
In 1945, he married Elizabeth Rossing in Argyle, Wisconsin. They have two daughters, Dr. Madeleine Forell Marshall and The Reverend Mary Forell Davis, four grandchildren and seven great-grandchildren.  He lived in Iowa City on Bella Vista Place.  Jason Kerber and Lori Rath provided house sitting services for him during the 1994–95 school year while Mr. Forell was a visiting professor at the GTU in Berkeley, CA.

Recognition
He received honorary degrees from Gustavus Adolphus College, Wartburg Theological Seminary, Luther College and Upsala College. In 1984, a Festschrift,  "Piety, Politics and Ethics", edited by Carter Lindberg, was published by the Sixteenth Century Journal Publishers, Inc. Forell was named the distinguished alum for 2002 from the Lutheran Theological Seminary at Philadelphia.

Published works
 "Faith Active in Love", 1954
 "Ethics of Decision", 1956
 "The Protestant Faith", 1960 
 "Understanding the Nicene Creed",1965 
 "History of Christian Ethics"  1975 
 "Martin Luther, Theologian of the Church: Collected Essays", 1994
 "Theology in Exile: A Personal Account" by George Wolfgang Forell (1919-2011) Translated by Carter Lindberg, Lutheran Quarterly 29 (2015), 304-311

References

American religion academics
German emigrants to the United States
University of Vienna alumni
Lutheran Theological Seminary at Philadelphia alumni
Union Theological Seminary (New York City) alumni
Princeton Theological Seminary alumni
Gustavus Adolphus College faculty
Academic staff of the University of Hamburg
University of Iowa faculty
Lutheran School of Theology at Chicago faculty
1919 births
2011 deaths